Pierre Moinot (29 March 1920, in Fressines, Deux-Sèvres – 6 March 2007, in Paris) was a French novelist. He was elected to the Académie française on 21 January 1982.

Bibliography
Armes et Bagages, roman  (1952)
La Chasse royale, roman  (1954) - Grand Prix du roman de l'Académie française – The Royal Hunt, tr. Ralph Manheim  (1955)
La Blessure, nouvelles  (1957)
Le Voleur, court métrage (adaptation)  (1960)
Le Sable vif, roman  (1964) – An Ancient Enemy, tr. Francis Price  (1965)
Repos à Bacoli, dramatique (1966)
Quand la liberté venait du ciel, série de douze dramatiques (1967)
Héliogabale, théâtre  (1971)
La Griffe et la Dent, album animalier  (1977)
Mazarin, série de quatre dramatiques originales    (1978)
Mazarin, scénario  (1978)
Le Guetteur d’ombre, roman  (1979)
Jeanne d'Arc, série de quatre dramatiques originales (1988, in collaboration with Jean-François Griblin)
Jeanne d’Arc, le pouvoir et l’innocence  (1988)
La Descente du fleuve, roman  (1991)
Tous comptes faits, entretiens  (1993)
T.E. Lawrence en guerre, étude  (1994)
Attention à la peinture  (1997)
Tous comptes faits, entretiens  (2nd edition, 1997)
Le matin vient et aussi la nuit  (1999) – As Night Follows Day, tr. Jody Gladding and Elizabeth Deshays (2001)
La Mort en lui  (2002)
Coup d'état  (2003)
La Saint-Jean d'été (2007)

External links
  L'Académie française

1920 births
2007 deaths
People from Deux-Sèvres
20th-century French novelists
21st-century French novelists
Prix Femina winners
Grand prix Jean Giono recipients
Prix Sainte-Beuve winners
Members of the Académie Française
Grand Prix du roman de l'Académie française winners
Prix des libraires winners
French male novelists
Grand Croix of the Légion d'honneur
French Resistance members
Recipients of the Croix de Guerre 1939–1945 (France)
Commandeurs of the Ordre des Arts et des Lettres
Officers of the Order of Agricultural Merit
20th-century French male writers
21st-century French male writers